The 1931 Italian Grand Prix was a Grand Prix motor race held at Monza on 24 May 1931. The race was the first of three Grands Prix that were part of the inaugural European Championship. The Alfa Romeo works team pairing of Giuseppe Campari and Tazio Nuvolari won the race, ahead of their teammates Ferdinando Minoia and Baconin Borzacchini in second, while third place went to the works Bugattis of Albert Divo and Guy Bouriat.

Entries

 — Luigi Arcangeli was originally designated as Campari's co-driver in car #26, but he was replaced by Marinoni after he was killed during practice.

Starting grid
Grid positions were allocated by drawing lots.

Classification

 — Nuvolari and Borzacchini did not receive the points for first and second place, respectively, because they were not driving in their designated cars. The seven points apiece that they received were for driving car #28, which completed less than a quarter of the race distance. Attilio Marinoni and Goffredo Zehender, who had been designated to drive cars #26 and #30, respectively, both received eight points, since they did not take part in the race.
 — Ruggeri and Balestrero were initially credited with 1290.534 km, putting them in sixth place. However, their final lap took more than five minutes to complete, so the fraction of the lap completed prior to the ten-hour mark was eliminated, demoting the pair to seventh, and promoting Pirola and Lurani to sixth.
 — Sénéchal and Frètet were not classified because they failed to complete at least three-fifths of the number of laps achieved by the race winner.

Notes:
The race was limited to ten hours. Each driver was allowed to complete a lap begun before the ten-hour cutoff (and retain the fraction of the lap already completed), provided that the lap took no more than five minutes.

References

Italian Grand Prix
Italian Grand Prix
Grand Prix